Domart-en-Ponthieu (literally Domart in Ponthieu) is a commune in the Somme department in Hauts-de-France in northern France.

Geography

History
After the Armistice following World War I, British troops from the Oxfordshire and Buckinghamshire Light Infantry were stationed at Domart-en-Ponthieu under the command of a Colonel Flanagan. Awaiting demobilisation, they were able to relax for a time. Private Arthur Bullock recalled this stay, including a memorable occasion on which he heard a talk by the renowned Woodbine Willie.

Population

Places of interest
 The Templars house
 The round tower (remains of the  château)
 Church
 The war memorial

 Aerial views

See also
Communes of the Somme department

References

Communes of Somme (department)